Eugene Petramale (born in Chicago, Illinois), known as "Gene" or "Gino", was a U.S. soccer and softball player.

Petramale grew up on Chicago's West Side where he attended John Marshall Metropolitan High School.  He earned one cap with the U.S. national team in a 3-1 World Cup qualification loss to Mexico on January 14, 1954.  Petramale was inducted into the Illinois Soccer Hall of Fame in 1986.  In addition to his successful soccer career, Petramale spent 42 years in the Chicago 16 inch softball leagues.  In 1970, his team, Dr. Carlucci's Bobcats won the American Softball Association national championship.  He was inducted into the Chicago 16 Inch Softball Hall of Fame in 2005.

References 

Living people
American soccer players
United States men's international soccer players
Association footballers not categorized by position
Male softball players
Sportspeople from Chicago
Softball players from Illinois
Year of birth missing (living people)
Soccer players from Chicago